Alien vs. Predator is a sci-fi horror franchise. This may also refer specifically to:

 Aliens vs. Predator (comics), several crossover comic series started in 1990
 Aliens vs. Predator (novel series), a trilogy of novels started in 1994
 Alien vs. Predator (film), a 2004 film
 Alien vs. Predator (soundtrack), a soundtrack album from the 2004 film, by Harald Kloser

Video games
 Alien vs. Predator (arcade game), a 1994 video game for the arcades
 Alien vs Predator (Atari Jaguar game), a 1994 video game for the Atari Jaguar
 Aliens versus Predator (1999 video game), a video game for personal computers
 Aliens vs. Predator (2010 video game), a video game for the PC, Xbox 360 and PlayStation 3

See also
 List of Alien, Predator and Alien vs. Predator games
 Predator (disambiguation)
 Alien (disambiguation)
 AVP (disambiguation)